Rezaabad (also Romanized as Reẕāābād) is a village in Hoseynabad Rural District, in the Central District of Anar County, Kerman Province, Iran. At the 2006 census, its population was 30, in 5 families.

References 

Populated places in Anar County